Oluf Christian Müller (11 June 1921 – 26 June 2001) was a Norwegian civil servant.

He was born in Kristiansund. He finished his secondary education in 1941, took commerce school in 1944 and then enrolled in law studies. He took the cand.jur. degree at the University of Oslo in 1949, and worked as a deputy judge in Oslo, Eidsvoll and Søre Sunnmøre before being hired as a secretary in the Ministry of Finance in 1951. He was promoted to assistant secretary in 1957, sub-director in 1963 and deputy under-secretary of state in 1967. From 1969 to 1989 he served as the permanent under-secretary of state in the Norwegian Ministry of Industry, the highest-ranking bureaucratic position. The ministry was renamed as the Ministry of Trade in 1988. From 1989 to 1991 he worked there as a special adviser.

He was decorated as a Commander of the Order of St. Olav and holds the Order of the Falcon.

References

1921 births
2001 deaths
People from Kristiansund
University of Oslo alumni
Norwegian jurists
Norwegian civil servants
Recipients of the Order of the Falcon